Schottenring  is a station on  and  of the Vienna U-Bahn.

It is located under the Donaukanal, in the border between the Innere Stadt and Leopoldstadt districts.

It opened in 2008.

References

External links 
 

Buildings and structures in Innere Stadt
Railway stations opened in 2008
Vienna U-Bahn stations
2008 establishments in Austria
Railway stations in Austria opened in the 21st century